In set theory, the union (denoted by ∪) of a collection of sets is the set of all elements in the collection. It is one of the fundamental operations through which sets can be combined and related to each other. 
A  refers to a union of  zero sets and it is by definition equal to the empty set. 

For explanation of the symbols used in this article, refer to the table of mathematical symbols.

Union of two sets 
The union of two sets A and B is the set of elements which are in A, in B, or in both A and B.  In set-builder notation,

.

For example, if A = {1, 3, 5, 7} and B = {1, 2, 4, 6, 7} then A ∪ B = {1, 2, 3, 4, 5, 6, 7}.  A more elaborate example (involving two infinite sets) is:
 A = {x is an even integer larger than 1}
 B = {x is an odd integer larger than 1}
 

As another example, the number 9 is not contained in the union of the set of prime numbers {2, 3, 5, 7, 11, ...} and the set of even numbers {2, 4, 6, 8, 10, ...}, because 9 is neither prime nor even.

Sets cannot have duplicate elements, so the union of the sets {1, 2, 3} and {2, 3, 4} is {1, 2, 3, 4}. Multiple occurrences of identical elements have no effect on the cardinality of a set or its contents.

Algebraic properties 

Binary union is an associative operation; that is, for any sets 

Thus the parentheses may be omitted without ambiguity: either of the above can be written as  Also, union is commutative, so the sets can be written in any order.
The empty set is an identity element for the operation of union. That is,  for any set  Also, the union operation is idempotent:   All these properties follow from analogous facts about logical disjunction.

Intersection distributes over union
 
and union distributes over intersection

The power set of a set  together with the operations given by union, intersection, and complementation, is a Boolean algebra.  In this Boolean algebra, union can be expressed in terms of intersection and complementation by the formula

where the superscript  denotes the complement in the universal set

Finite unions 
One can take the union of several sets simultaneously.  For example, the union of three sets A, B, and C contains all elements of A, all elements of B, and all elements of C, and nothing else. Thus, x is an element of A ∪ B ∪ C if and only if x is in at least one of A, B, and C.

A finite union is the union of a finite number of sets; the phrase does not imply that the union set is a finite set.

Arbitrary unions 

The most general notion is the union of an arbitrary collection of sets, sometimes called an infinitary union. If M is a set or class whose elements are sets, then x is an element of the union of M if and only if there is at least one element A of M such that x is an element of A. In symbols:
 
This idea subsumes the preceding sections—for example, A ∪ B ∪ C is the union of the collection {A, B, C}. Also, if M is the empty collection, then the union of M is the empty set.

Notations 
The notation for the general concept can vary considerably. In the case that the index set I is the set of natural numbers, one uses the notation , which is analogous to that of the infinite sums in series.

When the symbol "∪" is placed before other symbols (instead of between them), it is usually rendered as a larger size.

Notation encoding

In Unicode, union is represented by the character .

See also

 
  − the union of sets of strings

Notes

External links
 
 Infinite Union and Intersection at ProvenMath De Morgan's laws formally proven from the axioms of set theory.

Boolean algebra
Basic concepts in set theory
Operations on sets
Set theory